The 14th Asian Table Tennis Championships 1998 were held in Osaka, Japan, from 28 September to 4 October 1998. It was organised by the Japan Table Tennis Association under the authority of Asian Table Tennis Union (ATTU) and International Table Tennis Federation (ITTF).

Medal summary

Medal table

Events

See also
World Table Tennis Championships
Asian Cup

References

Asian Table Tennis Championships
Asian Table Tennis Championships
Table Tennis Championships
Table tennis competitions in Japan
Asian Table Tennis Championships
Asian Table Tennis Championships
Asian Table Tennis Championships